Daytime and the Dark is the fourth studio album by Australian musician, Mark Seymour. It contained acoustic versions of songs, most of which had appeared first on albums by Seymour's band Hunters & Collectors, and was released in March 2005. It also contained two new songs, "Good Ol' Boys" and "Dream You Had Last Night", as well as a cover version of Dragon's 1977 hit "April Sun in Cuba" as a duet with James Reyne. The album peaked at number 99 on the ARIA Charts.
 
The album was re-released in June 2012 under the title Greatest Hits Acoustic.

Track listing

Personnel
 Mark Seymour – guitars, vocals
 Cameron McGlinchie – drums
 Tony Floyd – percussion
 Cameron McKenzie – guitars, percussion
 Louise McCarthy – vocals
 James Black – keyboards
 Andrew Carswell – tin whistle

Charts

Release history

References

2005 albums
Mark Seymour albums